Karakuduru is a village near Kakinada in East Godavari District, Andhra Pradesh, India. Main occupation of this village is agriculture. The village is situated at Kakinada-paina state highway. Its comes under to peddapudi mandal. The village is full of green lush lands. The urbanization may affect the green lands of Karakuduru. Karakuduru has many canals.

See also
Aratlakatta

Villages in East Godavari district